The 2021 New York state elections were held on November 2, 2021. In addition to the standard local elections, many seats for the New York Supreme Court were to be filled in addition to ballot proposals regarding changing state electoral rules and court limits.

State ballot proposals

Background

Proposal 1 
This is a proposed constitutional amendment that would freeze the number of state senators at 63, amend the process for counting the state's population, delete certain provisions that violate the U.S. Constitution, repeal and amend certain requirements for the appointment of the co-executive directors of the redistricting commission, and amend the manner of drawing district lines for congressional and state legislative offices.

The measure would also scrap the current requirement that two-thirds of state lawmakers must agree to pass redistricting plans, in favor of simple majorities in both the Assembly and Senate. The proposal's opponents, including The League of Women Voters of New York State, have focused on this point, saying that allowing a simple majority to make such decisions could diminish a minority party's voting power.

Proposal 2 
This proposed amendment to Article I of the New York State Constitution would establish the right of each person to clean air and water and a healthful environment.

This measure would give New Yorkers a constitutional right to clean air, water and a "healthful environment." The proposal language is vague on what a "healthful environment" is or how the standard would be legally enforced.  Critics of the measure have cited its broad language as a concern, arguing that the lack of specificity could lead to unnecessary lawsuits. State Senator Dan Stec, a Republican who represents the North Country region, said in a statement that the proposal would place the burden of enforcement on the courts.

Proposal 3 
This proposed amendment would delete the current requirement in Article II, Section 5 (of the New York State Constitution) that a citizen be registered to vote at least ten days before an election and would allow the Legislature to enact laws permitting a citizen to register to vote less than ten days before the election.

If passed, the measure would make it possible for state lawmakers to adopt same-day voter registration, something that 20 states already have.  The measure would be particularly beneficial to voters who do not start paying attention to local politics until late in the election cycle, said Jan Combopiano, the senior policy director for the Brooklyn Voters Alliance.

Proposal 4 
This proposed amendment would delete from the current provision on absentee ballots the requirement that an absentee voter must be unable to appear at the polls by reason of absence from the county or illness or physical disability.

Under current law, mail-in ballots are only allowed for voters who expect to be away on Election Day, or who have an illness or disability that would prevent them from voting in person.  There was an increase in absentee ballots cast last year because of the coronavirus pandemic; Gov. Andrew M. Cuomo issued an executive order automatically providing all New Yorkers with absentee ballot applications.

Proposal 5 
The proposed amendment would increase the New York City Civil Court's jurisdiction by allowing it to hear and decide claims for up to $50,000 instead of the current jurisdictional limit of $25,000.

In theory, the measure is meant to make it faster, easier and less expensive for people to resolve disputes legally.  Although the change would be likely to increase the efficiency with which lawsuits are resolved, it might also increase the workload for the city's civil courts, which are already understaffed, said Sidney Cherubin, the director of legal services at the Brooklyn Volunteer Lawyers Project.

In support of proposals 
The New York State Democratic Committee (Democratic Party) and Working Families Party campaigned in support of proposals 1, 3, and 4. The reason for the proposals' rejection, according to some sources, is in part because of the parties being "largely quiet on the measures".

Against proposals 
The New York Republican State Committee (Republican Party) and Conservative Party of New York campaigned against proposals 1, 3, and 4 using the slogan "Just say no!".  According to NPR, the reason for the rejection of the proposals can be linked to large campaigning by the two parties to reject the proposals.

Results 

Proposals 2 (Right to Clean Air, Water, and Healthful Environment) and 5 (New York Civil Court Limit) passed, while proposals 1 (Redistricting), 3 (Voter Registration), and 4 (Absentee Voting) were rejected.

State Legislature

State Senate District 30

State Supreme Court

District 1 
In District 1, two winners are allowed.

District 2 
In District 2, seven winners are allowed.

District 3 
In District 3, three winners are allowed.

District 5

District 6 
In District 6, three winners are allowed.

District 7 
In District 7, two winners are allowed.

District 8 
In District 8, four winners are allowed. Rather unusually, the New York Democratic, Republican, Working Families and Conservative parties all endorsed the same justices.

District 9 
In District 9, five winners are allowed.

District 10 
In District 10, eight winners are allowed.

District 11 
In District 11, six winners are allowed.

District 12 
In District 12, five winners are allowed.

District 13

Mayoral elections 
A number of places throughout the state held mayoral elections.

Albany mayoral election

Buffalo mayoral election

Glen Cove mayoral election

New York City mayoral election

Peekskill mayoral election

Rochester mayoral election

Rye mayoral election

Suffern mayoral election

Syracuse mayoral election

County executives 
Several counties held county executive elections.

Nassau County

Rensselaer County

Rockland County

Westchester County

See also 

 Elections in New York (state)
 Bilingual elections requirement for New York (per Voting Rights Act Amendments of 2006)

Footnotes

Notes

Citations 

2021 New York (state) elections
New York (state) elections by year
New York